Cheetham Ice Tongue is a small ice tongue on the east coast of Victoria Land between Lamplugh Island and Whitmer Peninsula. It projects eastward into the Ross Sea. The tongue appears to be nourished in part by Davis Glacier and partly by ice draining from Lamplugh Island and Whitmer Peninsula. It was first charted by the British Antarctic Expedition, 1907–09, under Shackleton, and named by him for Alfred B. Cheetham, third officer on the Nimrod.

References
 

Ice tongues of Antarctica
Landforms of Victoria Land
Scott Coast